Daniel Offenbacher (born 18 February 1992) is an Austrian footballer who plays as a midfielder for Domžale.

Club career

Scheifling
Offenbacher started playing football at his local club SV Scheifling in Styria.

Red Bull Salzburg
Offenbacher played in different youth teams and came to Red Bull Salzburg in January 2006 and played for the under-17 and under-19 squads. His professional debut was in the second squad, Red Bull Juniors, in the match versus Wacker Innsbruck on 16 October 2009. His first match in the first squad was exactly one year later in the match versus SV Kapfenberg where he substituted Ibrahim Sekagya in the 68th minute.

Blau-Weiß Linz (loan)
In January 2012, he went out on loan to Blau-Weiß Linz of the Austrian second division.

Sturm Graz
In May 2013, it was confirmed that he agreed a two-year contract with Sturm Graz.

Sūduva
In August 2018, he signed for Lithuanian club Sūduva on a free transfer.

Hermannstadt
On 11 January 2019, Offenbacher joined Romanian club Hermannstadt.

Return to Sūduva
On 25 February 2020, Offenbacher rejoined Lithuanian club Sūduva.

SV Ried
On 17 August 2020, he signed with SV Ried.

Domžale
On 31 August 2022, Offenbacher signed a two-year contract with Slovenian PrvaLiga side Domžale.

Career statistics

Honours
Individual
A Lyga Team of the Year: 2018

References

External links
Player profile at FC Red Bull Salzburg

1992 births
Living people
People from Murau District
Footballers from Styria
Austrian footballers
Association football midfielders
Austria youth international footballers
Austria under-21 international footballers
FC Red Bull Salzburg players
FC Blau-Weiß Linz players
SC Wiener Neustadt players
SK Sturm Graz players
Wolfsberger AC players
FK Sūduva Marijampolė players
FC Hermannstadt players
SV Ried players
NK Domžale players
2. Liga (Austria) players
Austrian Regionalliga players
Austrian Football Bundesliga players
A Lyga players
Liga I players
Slovenian PrvaLiga players
Austrian expatriate footballers
Expatriate footballers in Lithuania
Austrian expatriate sportspeople in Lithuania
Expatriate footballers in Romania
Austrian expatriate sportspeople in Romania
Expatriate footballers in Slovenia
Austrian expatriate sportspeople in Slovenia